Salvia pauciserrata is a variable and widely distributed species of Salvia native to Peru, north to Venezuela and Costa Rica. It is found in a wide variety of habitats.

References

pauciserrata
Flora of Colombia